Paul Kousoulides is a British television and film director.

Kousoulides is a graduate of the National Film and Television School. His debut film, Bass Odyssey (2000), was broadcast on Channel 4 and was nominated for the Royal Television Society Award for Best Fictional Short. His next film, Inferno (2001), starring Sanjeev Baskhar, was nominated for the BAFTA Award for Best Short Film in 2001. It won the Best Short Film prize at the 2002 London Sci-Fi Festival.

Kousoulides directed three episodes of the ITV comedy drama Cold Feet in 2001, two episodes of the Sky One series Mile High in 2004, and an episode of the BBC One medical drama Holby City in 2005.

Filmography

References

External links
Paul Kousoulides at the British Film Institute

Living people
British film directors
British television directors
British people of Greek descent
Alumni of the National Film and Television School
Year of birth missing (living people)